Karappankadu is a village in the Pattukkottai taluk of Thanjavur district, Tamil Nadu, India. The village is most famous for its Abeeshta Varadhan kovil (temple).

Demographics 

As per the 2001 census, Karappankadu had a total population of 589 with 264 males and 325 females. The sex ratio was 1231. The literacy rate was 73.85.

References 

 

Villages in Thanjavur district